This is a chronology of major events in the Malaysian Expressway System. The Malaysian Expressway System is a network of controlled-access highways in Malaysia.

1960s

1970s

1980s

1990s

2000s

2010s

2020s

Upcoming events

See also 
 Malaysian Expressway System
 List of Expressways and Highways in Malaysia

Malaysian Expressway System
Malaysian Public Works Department